Riccarton is an area in Edinburgh's Green Belt, in Scotland. It is mainly undeveloped, with much farmland and few houses.

Riccarton is to the west of the Edinburgh City Bypass (the A720), and is known for being the location of Heriot-Watt University's main campus, including Oriam, Scotland's National Performance Centre for Sport which opened to the public in August 2016.

There have been a number of controversies over potential development in the area in recent years.

The area is bordered by Currie, Juniper Green and Curriehill to the south, The Calders (Wester Hailes) to the east, and Hermiston to the north.

References

External links
Heriot-Watt University

Areas of Edinburgh